German submarine U-405 was a Type VIIC U-boat of Nazi Germany's Kriegsmarine during World War II.

The U-boat was laid down on 8 July 1940 at the Danziger Werft shipyard at Danzig, launched on 4 June 1941 and commissioned on 17 September 1941. She was commanded by Korvettenkapitän Rolf-Heinrich Hopman.

Design 
German Type VIIC submarines were preceded by the shorter Type VIIB submarines. U-405 had a displacement of  when at the surface and  while submerged. She had two shafts and two  propellers.

U-405 was fitted with five  torpedo tubes (four fitted at the bow and one at the stern), fourteen torpedoes, one  SK C/35 naval gun, 220 rounds, and a  C/30 anti-aircraft gun. The boat had a complement of between forty-four and sixty.

Service history 

After her commissioning, U-405 joined the 8th U-boat Flotilla for training, before serving with the 1st, 11th and 6th U-boat flotillas under operational conditions.

Patrol history 
Of her eight war patrols, only on the sixth did U-405 sink any ships. On 28 February 1943, south-west of Iceland, she sank the 7,176 GRT American liberty ship SS Wade Hampton. A straggler from Convoy HX 227, Wade Hampton was en route to Murmansk from New York, carrying 8,000 tons of general cargo as well as two PT boats (RPT-1 and RPT-3).

Nine days later, on 9 March 1943, U-405 sank the 4,665 GRT Norwegian ship Bonneville which was en route from New York to Liverpool as part of Convoy SC 121, and carrying 7,196 tons of general cargo, explosives and the tank landing craft HMS LCT-2341 as deck cargo.

After this success, U-405s seventh war patrol began badly, when at 19.24 hours on 4 May 1943, only two days out of Saint-Nazaire, the boat was attacked in the Bay of Biscay by a British Halifax GR.II Series IA bomber of 502 Squadron, RAF Coastal Command. The aircraft dropped three bombs, causing an oil leak that could not be repaired, prompting the captain to abort the patrol on 12 May. While returning home, on 18 May, northwest of Cape Finisterre, U-405 was bombed again, this time by an Australian Sunderland patrol bomber of 10 Squadron, although she escaped without any damage.

Sinking 
The destroyer initially fired depth charges, after which U-405 came (and was probably forced) to the surface. Borie then rammed U-405. After the ramming, Borie was high-centered on top of U-405, and until they separated, exchanges of small arms fire took place. This was a unique battle: unlike other modern naval actions, it was decided by ramming and small arms fire at extremely close range.

Normally, in a surface engagement the superior armament and greater reserve buoyancy of the destroyer would have been decisive. But in this unusual case, the destroyer was unable to depress her  and  guns enough to engage, while all of the submarine's armament could be brought to bear. Borie's crew had a limited number of small arms, the German deck mounts were completely open and had no protection. In the extended and bitter fighting that ensued, dozens of German sailors were killed in desperate attempts to man the  deck gun. Their casualties included those struck by a sheath-knife and a 4-inch cartridge case.

At this point, about 35 of the German crew of 49 had been killed or lost overboard. Borie had been badly damaged and was moving at a reduced speed, while the submarine was still capable of maneuvering at a similar speed. U-405s tighter turning radius effectively prevented Borie from bringing her superior firepower to bear; Hopman did a masterful job of maneuvering his badly damaged boat with his remaining crew. Borie shut-off her searchlight, her crew hoping that U-405 would attempt to escape and provide a better target for her guns. The submarine did indeed attempt to speed away, and Borie switched her searchlight back on and turned to bring her guns and a depth charge thrower to bear. The submarine was bracketed by shallow-set depth charges and struck by a 4-inch shell, and came to a stop. Borie crew observed about 14 sailors signalling their surrender and abandoning ship in yellow rubber rafts. Hutchins gave the order to cease fire; several of them were apparently wounded, being loaded into the rafts on stretchers by their shipmates.

The last to leave the stricken ship was wearing an officer's cap. U-405 sank slowly by the stern at 0257. She was seen to explode underwater, probably from scuttling charges set by the last officer to leave.
Hutchins reported later:

The survivors were observed firing Very star-shells: Bories crew believed this to be a distress signal, and maneuvered in an attempt to recover them from their rubber rafts, as they approached to 50-60 yards off the port bow. But as it turned out, the Germans were signalling another surfaced U-boat, which answered with a star-shell of her own.

A Borie lookout reported a torpedo passing close by from that U-boat, Borie had no choice but to protect herself by sailing away. She was forced to sail through U-405s rafts as she turned away from the other U-boat, but the men on the rafts were observed firing another Very flare as Borie steamed away in a radical zigzag pattern. No German survivors were ever recovered by either side; all 49 crewmen were lost.

Borie lost three officers and 27 crew members, and was too badly damaged by the collision to be towed to port.

Wolfpacks 
U-405 took part in nine wolfpacks, namely:
 Wrangel (11 – 18 March 1942)
 Strauchritter (2 – 5 May 1942)
 Nebelkönig (27 July – 14 August 1942)
 Trägertod (12 – 18 September 1942)
 Boreas (19 November – 9 December 1942)
 Neptun (18 February – 3 March 1943)
 Westmark (6 – 11 March 1943)
 Siegfried (25 – 27 October 1943)
 Siegfried 1 (27 – 30 October 1943)

Summary of raiding history

References

Notes

Citations

Bibliography

External links 

German Type VIIC submarines
U-boats commissioned in 1941
U-boats sunk in 1943
World War II submarines of Germany
1941 ships
U-boats sunk by US warships
World War II shipwrecks in the Atlantic Ocean
Ships built in Danzig
U-boats sunk in collisions
Ships lost with all hands
Maritime incidents in November 1943